The Mack NJU 5- to 6-ton 4x4 Ponton tractor (G639) was a semi-tractor designed to haul bridging equipment during World War II. Of the 700 built 119 were supplied to the British in Egypt, 8 were built with van bodies, and the rest were used as a substitute standard by the US Army.

History
In 1940 the US Army ordered 700 Mack 4 x 4 truck tractors, intended to tow pontoon-carrying semi-trailers. 694 were delivered in 1941 and the last 6 in 1942. An Autocar design was standardized by the US Army and only 700 NJUs were built.

692 NJU-1 tractors and 8 NJU-2 vans designed to tow topographical trailers were delivered.

In November 1941 119 semi-tractors were delivered to the British army in Egypt, where they bore War Department H-numbers.

Some NJU-1's went into French Army service post war.

Design

The design was a militarized version of a civilian Cab Over Engine (COE) model, partly redesigned to make it 4WD. A Mack engine and transmission were matched with a Timken 2-speed transfer case and double-reduction axles. The EN532 engine was a   L-head inline 6 cylinder gasoline engine developing  at 2500 rpm. The 5-speed transmission drove the separate transfer case.

A ladder frame had two live beam axles on leaf springs with a  wheelbase. There was a  winch behind the front bumper and a pintle hitch at the rear. A civilian type closed cab was used, right behind the cab was an open cargo box used to carry engineer tools, outboard motors, and other equipment.

Early semi-tractors and all vans used 9.75x20 tires, later semi-tractors had 12.00x20 tires. All trucks had dual rear tires. All trucks had full-air brakes.

Gallery

References

 
 
 TM-10-1704 NJU-1
 TM 10-1705 NJU-1, -2, August 1941

External links

Olive Drab-article
Trucks'Planet-article

Military trucks of the United States
NJU
World War II military vehicles
Military vehicles introduced from 1940 to 1944